Artajo is a Spanish surname. Notable people with the surname include:

 Alberto Martín-Artajo (1905–1979), Spanish politician
 Jorge Artajo (born 1952), Spanish artist, writer, performer, and social activist

Spanish-language surnames